Qasim II khan (died 1532) was a ruler of Astrakhan Khanate in 1532. He was a son of Big Horde's khan Sayed Akhmad, and a grandson of Akhmat. He occupied Xacitarxan throne with the help of Nogays. He was a supporter of centralization policy. He is known to send a letter to Ottoman sultan Süleyman in 1531/1532. He was deposed and killed by Aq Kübek. For uncertainties and additional information see the second part of List of Astrakhan khans.

1532 deaths
Khans of Astrakhan
Year of birth unknown